Please don't delete this article because this actor or actress is new and will play/is playing a lead, supporting or breakthrough role in the tokusatsu series "Kamen Rider Build" and will continue their career and make more roles, either lead or supporting, after the end of the programme.

 is a Japanese actor and former model. He was born in Adachi, Tokyo, and grew up in Saitama Prefecture. He is represented with the agency Oscar Promotion. He graduated from Meiji Gakuin Senior High School and Aoyama Gakuin University Law school. His wife is former Fuji Television announcer Maya Masai.

Biography
For eleven years since 1993, he was a model in fashion magazines, etc. He acted as a fashion model at New York City, Paris, Tokyo, and Milan fashion shows.

On 13 April 2005, he declared his acting debut at the "2005 Debut Declaration Announcement Interview" affiliation by Oscar Promotion and turned into an actor. Play the role of a president of an IT company in the Tokyo Broadcasting System Television drama Yume de Aimashou starting on the following day on 14 April.

In 2007, the Toei Company film Ore wa, Kimi no tameni koso Shini ni iku played his first film role.

He received the "Model Star Award" at the "Asia Model Festival Awards" held in South Korea in January 2009

Personal life
In his private life, he married former Fuji Television announcer Maya Masai on 15 March 2007. Their eldest daughter became their first child on 20 September of the same year, and later a boy who became their second child on 19 March 2011 was born.

His hobbies are going outdoors, fishing, and kickboxing. The "Royal Angler Award" which awarded to fishing enthusiasts in various fields in which he has been awarded in 2014.

Modelling activities

Magazines

Shows

He appeared in numerous brands, fashion shows, etc.

Acting activities

Television

Films

References

External links
 
 
 – Ameba Blog 
 (Membership registration is necessary for viewing) 

Japanese male models
Japanese male actors
Aoyama Gakuin University alumni
People from Saitama Prefecture
People from Tokyo
1973 births
Living people